Bremen-Oslebshausen is a railway station located on the Vegesack-Bremen and Bremen-Bremerhaven railway lines. Only services on the Vegesack-Bremen line call at the station; services to and from Bremerhaven pass through without stopping.

References

Railway stations in Bremen (state)
Transport in Bremen (city)
Bremen S-Bahn